The first season of Teen Wolf, an American supernatural drama, was developed by Jeff Davis based upon the 1985 film of the same name, premiered on June 5, 2011, and concluded on August 15, 2011, on the MTV network. The season featured 12 episodes.

Plot
Scott McCall (Tyler Posey), is an average teenager suffering from asthma and living with his single mother in Beacon Hills. One night, he and his best friend Stiles Stilinski (Dylan O'Brien), the son of the local sheriff, Sheriff Stilinski (Linden Ashby), learn about half a corpse found by police in the woods. The two set out to find the other half, but Scott is attacked and bitten by a werewolf. With his new-found lycanthropy, Scott gains supernatural abilities, such as enhanced speed and heightened senses, enabling him to excel as the captain of his Beacon Hills High School lacrosse team. He gains respect from popular girl, Lydia Martin (Holland Roden) and the envy of her lacrosse-playing boyfriend Jackson Whittemore (Colton Haynes). Scott also develops a romantic relationship with school newcomer, Allison Argent (Crystal Reed); however, he discovers her father Chris Argent (JR Bourne) is a werewolf hunter.

Scott and Stiles meet Beta werewolf Derek Hale (Tyler Hoechlin), whose family perished in flames during a mysterious house fire 6 years previously. They uncover the second half of the missing corpse and discover it is Derek's sister, Laura Hale. Scott learns the Alpha werewolf, the most powerful of all wolves, is on a murdering spree and was responsible for biting him. Realizing the consequences and dangers of his new life, he is forced to protect his peers and loved ones, including his girlfriend Allison, who does not know she belongs to a family of werewolf hunters.

Allison's cruel werewolf-hunter aunt, Kate Argent (Jill Wagner), arrives into town. Derek suspects Scott's mysterious veterinarian boss, Dr. Alan Deaton (Seth Gilliam) is the Alpha, but after it is confirmed that he is not, Alan concedes he is aware of the supernatural world and becomes Scott's ally. Jackson learns Scott is a werewolf and devises a plan to become a werewolf himself to rival Scott's success at lacrosse. The Alpha werewolf is revealed to be Derek's uncle, Peter Hale (Ian Bohen), who was the only survivor of the fire. Kate reveals to Derek that it was she who started the fire, and she also reveals the existence of werewolves to Allison.

Chris Argent finds out that Scott is a werewolf, but realizes he is innocent. Peter bites Lydia, who becomes catatonic, and it later turns out that she is mysteriously immune to the bite. Allison discovers that Scott is a werewolf, but this does not change her romantic feelings about him. Scott finds out that Peter had killed Laura (his niece) to become an Alpha werewolf. Allison sees that her aunt Kate is actually cruel and remorseless, and Peter gains revenge for the fire that killed his family by finally killing Kate. However, Derek kills Peter, and becomes the new Alpha werewolf. At the end, Jackson demands Derek bite him and Derek complies.

Adrian Harris (Adam Fristoe), Coach Bobby Finstock (Orny Adams), Danny Mahealani (Keahu Kahuanui), Melissa McCall (Melissa Ponzio) and Victoria Argent (Eaddy Mays) also appear during the season.

Cast

Main
 Tyler Posey as Scott McCall
 Crystal Reed as Allison Argent
 Dylan O'Brien as Stiles Stilinski
 Tyler Hoechlin as Derek Hale
 Holland Roden as Lydia Martin
 Colton Haynes as Jackson Whittemore

Recurring

Episodes

Awards and nominations

Reception
The review aggregator website Rotten Tomatoes reported an approval rating of 68% and an average rating of 7.09/10 for the first season, based on 25 reviews. The website's critics consensus reads, "Thanks to a charismatic lead in Tyler Posey and some dark, biting humor, Teen Wolf is a pleasant summer surprise, even if it does tread familiar ground." 

On Metacritic, which uses a weighted average, the season has a score of 61 out of 100, based on 47 critics, indicating "Generally favorable reviews".

Home media
Season 1 was released on DVD in the United States on May 22, 2012, which is 12 days before the premiere of season 2 on June 3, 2012.

References

External links

2011 American television seasons
Teen Wolf (2011 TV series)